The 1998 Oceania Junior Athletics Championships were held at the Teufaiva Stadium in Nuku'alofa, Tonga, between August 27–28, 1998.  They were held together with the 1998 Oceania Open Championships. A total of 37 events were contested, 19 by men and 18 by women.

Medal summary
Complete results can be found as compiled by Bob Snow on the Athletics Papua New Guinea, on the Athletics Weekly, and on the World Junior Athletics History webpages.

Boys under 20 (Junior)

Girls under 20 (Junior)

Medal table (unofficial)

Participation (unofficial)
An unofficial count yields the number of about 124 athletes from 15 countries:

 (13)
 (5)
 (19)
 (1)
 (6)
 (6)
 (13)
 (6)
 (3)
 (8)
 (7)
 (5)
/ (8)
 (20)
 (4)

References

Oceania Junior Athletics Championships
Athletics in Tonga
Oceanian U20 Championships
1998 in Tongan sport
International sports competitions hosted by Tonga
1998 in youth sport